Eszter Ágnes Siti (born 12 November 1977 in Nagykanizsa)  is a former Hungarian handball player. She is a European champion and World Championship silver medalist. Her sister, Beáta Siti, also a Hungarian international handballer, who currently works as a technical director and coach.

Siti temporarily retired from professional handball in 2009 but returned to action in the summer of 2012. Two years later, in 2014 she decided to retire for good.

Achievements
Nemzeti Bajnokság I:
Winner: 1996, 1997, 2000, 2002
Magyar Kupa:
Winner: 1996, 1997, 2001, 2003
Slovenian Championship:
Winner: 2007, 2008
Slovenian Cup:
Winner: 2007, 2008
World Championship:
Silver Medalist: 2003
Bronze Medalist: 2005
European Championship:
Winner: 2000
Bronze Medalist: 2004

References

External links
Profile on Handball.hu

1977 births
Living people
People from Nagykanizsa
Hungarian female handball players
Olympic handball players of Hungary
Handball players at the 2004 Summer Olympics
Expatriate handball players
Hungarian expatriates in Slovenia
Hungarian expatriates in Denmark
Fehérvár KC players
Sportspeople from Zala County